Vendor is an unincorporated community in Newton County, Arkansas, United States. The ZIP Code is 72683. It connects with Mt. Judea and Piercetown. It is home to many things such as a creek that runs from Deer all the way past Piercetown. Vendor's name is derived from the merchants who would stop and sell their wares by the road, according to local legend.

External links
 Newton County Historical Society

Unincorporated communities in Newton County, Arkansas
Unincorporated communities in Arkansas